All Little Devils is the third studio album by the Norwegian gothic metal band Dismal Euphony.  It was released in 1999, and was the band's first album with Nuclear Blast.

Track listing 
 "Days of Sodom" (5:22)
 "Rage of Fire" (3:44)
 "Victory" (4:31)
 "All Little Devils" (4:12)
 "Lunatic" (4:19)
 "Psycho Path" (4:03)
 "Shine for Me, Misery" (6:20)
 "Scenario" (4:12)
 "Dead Words" (2:17)

Production 
 Recorded and mixed at Woodhouse Studios
 Produced by Waldemar Sorychta
 Engineered by Siggi Bemm & Waldemar Sorychta
 Mastered by Siggi Bemm
 Logo by Vibeke Tveiten
 Cover and layout by Thomas Ewerhard

Notes 

1999 albums
Dismal Euphony albums
Albums produced by Waldemar Sorychta